
Gmina Raniżów is a rural gmina (administrative district) in Kolbuszowa County, Subcarpathian Voivodeship, in south-eastern Poland.

Villages
Gmina Raniżów contains the villages and settlements of Korczowiska, Mazury, Poręby Wolskie, Posuchy, Raniżów, Staniszewskie, Wola Raniżowska and Zielonka.

Neighbouring gminas
Gmina Raniżów is bordered by the gminas of Dzikowiec, Głogów Małopolski, Jeżowe, Kamień, Kolbuszowa and Sokołów Małopolski.

References
Polish official population figures 2006

Ranizow
Kolbuszowa County